Magoodhoo as a place name may refer to:
 Magoodhoo (Faafu Atoll) (Republic of Maldives)
 Magoodhoo (Noonu Atoll) (Republic of Maldives)